Anastasia Alekseyevna Tatareva (born 19 July 1997) is a Russian group rhythmic gymnast. She is 2016 Olympics Group all-around champion, a three-time (2015, 2017, 2018) World Group all-around champion, the 2015 European Games Group all-around champion, and three-time European Championships (2014, 2016, 2018) Group all-around gold medalist.

Career 
Tatareva began rhythmic gymnastics in her hometown junior sports school "Viktoria", she first came in under the guidance of coach Anna Shumilova where she would eventually relocate to train under Russia's central national team gymnastics program.

Tatareva became an official member of the Russian national group in the 2014 season, she was member of the Russian group that won group all-around gold at the 2014 European Championships in Baku, Azerbaijan.

In 2015, Tatareva and the Russian group competed at the inaugural 2015 European Games, taking gold in group all-around and 5 ribbons. They ended their season by winning gold in Group all-around at the 2015 World Championships in Stuttgart, Germany, as well as gold in 6 Clubs/2 Hoops and silver in 5 Ribbons. At these Worlds, Russia finally regained the gold medal in the all-around competition, after eight years, the last time they won the group competition was at the 2007 World Championships held in Patras, Greece.

In 2016, Tatareva and the Russian group won group gold at the 2016 European Championships in Holon, Israel. On August 19–21, Tatareva was member of the golden winning Russian group (together with Anastasia Maksimova, Maria Tolkacheva, Anastasia Bliznyuk, Vera Biryukova) that won gold at the 2016 Summer Olympics held in Rio de Janeiro, Brazil.

In 2017, Tatareva along with the Russian group competed at the 2017 Grand Prix Moscow where they won gold in group all-around, 3 balls + 2 ropes and silver medal in 5 hoops.

She was selected to represent Russia in group competition at the 2020 Olympic Games in Tokyo, Japan together with Anastasia Maksimova, Anastasia Bliznyuk, Angelina Shkatova and Alisa Tishchenko.

Detailed Olympic results

References

External links
 
 
 

1997 births
Living people
Russian rhythmic gymnasts
Sportspeople from Yekaterinburg
Olympic gymnasts of Russia
Olympic gold medalists for Russia
Olympic silver medalists for the Russian Olympic Committee athletes
Olympic medalists in gymnastics
Gymnasts at the 2016 Summer Olympics
Medalists at the 2016 Summer Olympics
Medalists at the 2020 Summer Olympics
Gymnasts at the 2015 European Games
European Games medalists in gymnastics
European Games gold medalists for Russia
Medalists at the Rhythmic Gymnastics World Championships
Medalists at the Rhythmic Gymnastics European Championships
Gymnasts at the 2020 Summer Olympics